Instituto Regional de Educación is a Chilean high school located in Rancagua, Cachapoal Province, Chile.

References 

Educational institutions established in 1982
Secondary schools in Chile
Schools in Cachapoal Province
1982 establishments in Chile